The 2004-05 season is the ninth in the history of the Glasgow Warriors as a professional side. During this season the young professional side competed as Glasgow Rugby.

The 2004-05 season saw Glasgow Rugby compete in the competitions:- the Celtic League; and the European Champions Cup, the Heineken Cup for sponsorship reasons; and the second and final season of the Celtic Cup.

Season Overview

Team

Coaches

Head coach:  Hugh Campbell 
Assistant coach:  Shade Munro
Assistant coach:  Sean Lineen

Staff

Chairman: Bill Nolan
Vice-Chairman: Archie Ferguson
Chief executive: David Jordan
Media Manager: Bill McMurtrie
Team Facilitator: Dougie Mills
Sales & Marketing Executive: Gordon Hood
Administration Manager: Diane Murphy
Team doctor: Gerry Haggerty
Physiotherapists: Bob Stewart, Lisa Casey

Squad

Academy players

  Fergus Thomson - Hooker
  James Eddie - Flanker
  John Barclay - Flanker
  Johnnie Beattie - Number Eight

  Colin Gregor - Fly-half
  Steven Duffy - Fly-half

Back up players

  Eric Milligan
  Ben Prescott
  Scott Lines
  Colin Shaw
  Wes Henry
  Nick Lavell
  Scott Forrest
  Steven Manning

  Neil McKenzie
  Richard Maxton
  Damien Kelly
  Jonathan van der Schyff
  Steve Swindall
  Shaun Renwick
  Mark Sitch
  Ally Maclay

Player statistics

During the 2004–05 season, Glasgow have used 39 different players in competitive games. The table below shows the number of appearances and points scored by each player.

Staff movements

Coaches

Personnel in

 Mark Bitcon - Fitness coach from  Wasps

Personnel out

None.

Player movements

Academy promotions

Player transfers

In

 Andy Craig from  Orrell
 Kevin Tkachuk from  Birmingham & Solihull
 Kenny Logan from  Wasps
 Dan Turner from  Canterbury
 John Barclay from  Dollar Academy
 Johnnie Beattie from  Aberdeen GSFP RFC
 Steven Duffy from  Glasgow Hawks

 Colin Gregor from  Watsonians RFC
 Fergus Thomson from  Glasgow Hawks
 Scott Barrow from  Rotherham
 Rory Lamont from  Glasgow Hawks

Out

 Rory McKay to  Manly RUFC
 Glenn Metcalfe to  Castres Olympique
 Jon Steel to  Border Reivers
 Stuart Moffat to  Border Reivers

 Alan Bulloch to  Glasgow Hutchesons Aloysians
 Kenny Sinclair to  Glasgow Hawks
 Simon Gunn released
 Roland Reid to  London Irish
 Mark McMillan to  Yorkshire Carnegie
 Matt Proudfoot released

Competitions

Pre-season and friendlies

Match 1

Leeds Tykes: ?
Replacements: ?

Glasgow Warriors:G Beveridge, A Bulloch, C Gregor, A Henderson, C Howarth, R Lamont, S Lamont, K Logan, R McKnight, D Millard, C Shaw, J Beardshaw,J Beattie, G Bulloch, P Dearlove, A Hall, L Harrison, A Kelly, S Lawson, E Milligan, J Petrie, S Renwick, N Ross, S Swindall, K Tkachuk, D Turner.
Replacements:

Match 2

Glasgow Warriors:Kevin Tkachuk, Scott Lawson, Lee Harrison, Nathan Ross, Andy Hall, Paul Dearlove, Jon Petrie (captain), Shawn Renwick,Graeme Beveridge, Calvin Howarth, Kenny Logan, Andrew Henderson, Graeme Morrison, Rory Kerr, Rory Lamont
Replacements: used: Scott Barrow, Alex Mockford, Alasdhair McFarlane, Dan Turner, Colin Gregor, Dave Millard, Sean Lamont, Johnnie Beattie; not used: Fergus Thomson, Gordon Bulloch, Andy Kelly, Donnie Macfadyen

Sale Sharks:Chris Mayor; Mark Cueto, Jos Baxendell (captain), Robert Todd, Steve Hanley; Mike Hercus, Bryan Redpath; Trevor Woodman, Sebastien Bruno, Andrew Sheridan, Dean Schofield, Christian Day, Jason White, Sebastian Chabel, John Carter
Replacements: Stuart Turner, Andrew Titterell, Barry Stewart, Pierre Caillet, Hugh Perrett, Sililo Martens, Charlie Hodgson, Mike Bartlett, Chris Jones, James Moore, Richard Wigglesworth

Match 3

Sale Sharks:Jason Robinson (captain); Mark Cueto, Jos Baxendell, Robert Todd, Steve Hanley; Charlie Hodgson, Sililo MartensTrevor Woodman, Andy Titterrell, Barry Stewart, Dean Schofield, Chris Day, Jason White, Sebastien Chabal, Magnus Lund
Replacements: Chris Mayor, Chris Rhys Jones, Mike Hercus, Bryan Redpath, Andrew Sheridan, Stuart Turner, Pierre Caillet, Sebastien Bruno, John Carter, Hugh Perrett

Glasgow Warriors:Kevin Tkachuk, Scott Lawson, Lee Harrison, Nathan Ross, Dan Turner, Andy Hall, Donnie Macfadyen, Paul Dearlove,Sam Pinder, Colin Gregor, Kenny Logan (captain), Scott Barrow, Graeme Morrison, Sean Lamont, Rory Kerr
Replacements: used: Joe Beardshaw, Andy Kelly, Calvin Howarth, Steve Swindall, Graeme Beveridge, Andrew Henderson, Andy HallDave Millard; not used: Gordon Bulloch

Match 4

Glasgow Warriors:Rory Lamont; Steven Manning, Andy Craig, Ally Maclay, David Millard; Calvin Howarth, Graeme Beveridge; Elliot McLaren,Ferguson Thomson, Fraser Mackinnon, James Eddie, Sandy Warnock, John Beattie, Shawn Renwick, Neil McKenzie.
Replacements: Colin Shaw, Colin Gregor, Alasdhair McFarlane, Andrew Kelly, Stuart Fenwick, Donald Malcolm, Andrew Wilson, Alan Kelly, Stevie Swindall (all used)
 

Newcastle Falcons: Ed Burrill; Amarveer Ladhar, Adam Dehaty, Mark Laycock, Stephen Jones; Toby Flood, Lee Dickson; Jonny Williams, Rob Vickers, Ed Kalman, Andy Buist, Geoff Parling, Eni Gesinde, Greg Irwin, Ed Williamson
Replacements:  Danny Brown, Rupert Neville, Mark Darlington, Gareth Kerr, Jason Smithson, Jack Harrison, Jamie Rennie, Stuart Walker

Match 5

Sale Sharks: Alex Davies; Matt Riley, Adam Robson, Jason Duffy, Olly Viney; David Blair, Ben Foden; Danny Greenhalgh, Neil Dowridge, Martin Halsall, Steve Burns, Ben Lloyd, Stuart Coackley, Mike Hills, Adam Newton. 
Replacements: Chris Leck, Mark Simpson-Daniel, Chris Briers, Tom Mantell, Aled Davies, Matt Sheen, Dan Hall, Daniel Fernandez-Arias.

Glasgow Warriors: Andy Kelly (Glasgow), Fergus Thomson (Apprentice & Glasgow Hawks), Donald Malcolm (Academy & GHA), Elliot McLaren (Biggar), Stuart Fenwick (Ayr), Euan Murray (Glasgow), Jonathan van der Schyff (Currie), Steve Swindall (Glasgow Hawks), Andy Wilson (Glasgow), John Beattie (Apprentice & GHA), Shawn Renwick (Stirling County), Andy Dunlop (Biggar), Graeme Beveridge (Glasgow), Alasdhair McFarlane (Hillhead/Jordanhill), Calvin Howarth (Glasgow), Colin Gregor (Apprentice & Watsonians), Andy Craig (Glasgow), Rory Lamont (Glasgow), Dave Millard (Glasgow), Colin Shaw (Hawks), Steven Manning (Ayr)
Replacements: all used.

European Champions Cup

Pool 3

Results

Round 1

Round 2

Round 3

Round 4

Round 5

Round 6

Magners Celtic League

League table

Results

Round 1

Round 2

Round 3

Round 4

Round 5

Round 6

Round 7

Round 8

Round 9

Round 10

Round 11

Round 12

Round 13

Round 14

Glasgow Warriors sat out round.

Round 15

Round 16

Round 17

Round 18

Round 19

Glasgow Warriors sat out round.

Round 20

Round 21

Round 22

Celtic Cup

Only 8 sides contested this year's Celtic Cup so the competition effectively began at the quarter final stage.

The match pairings were decided by the finishes in the previous year's Celtic League.

Results

Quarter-final

End of Season awards

Competitive debuts this season

A player's nationality shown is taken from the nationality at the highest honour for the national side obtained; or if never capped internationally their place of birth. Senior caps take precedence over junior caps or place of birth; junior caps take precedence over place of birth. A player's nationality at debut may be different from the nationality shown. Combination sides like the British and Irish Lions or Pacific Islanders are not national sides, or nationalities.

Players in BOLD font have been capped by their senior international XV side as nationality shown.

Players in Italic font have capped either by their international 7s side; or by the international XV 'A' side as nationality shown.

Players in normal font have not been capped at senior level.

A position in parentheses indicates that the player debuted as a substitute. A player may have made a prior debut for Glasgow Warriors in a non-competitive match, 'A' match or 7s match; these matches are not listed.

Tournaments where competitive debut made:

Crosshatching indicates a jointly hosted match.

Sponsorship

Main Sponsor

 Highland Spring

Official Kit Supplier

Cotton Traders

Club Sponsors

 Maclay Murray & Spens
 Clyde 1
 Scotland on Sunday
 The Glasgow Club
 Musashi
 Scotland against Drugs

References

2004-05
Glasgow
Glasgow
Glasgow